Bertram Hopkinson   (11 January 1874 – 26 August 1918) was a British patent lawyer and Professor of Mechanism and Applied Mechanics at Cambridge University.  In this position he researched flames, explosions and metallurgy and became a pioneer designer of the internal combustion engine.

Hopkinson was born in Birmingham, in 1874, the son of John Hopkinson, an electrical engineer. He read law at Trinity College, Cambridge, and became a lawyer after his graduation. Following the death of his father, brother and two of his sisters in a mountaineering accident in 1898, Hopkinson switched to a career in engineering instead.

In 1903, Hopkinson was elected to the Cambridge chair in mechanism and applied mechanics, and in 1910 he was elected a Fellow of the Royal Society.  During World War I he was commissioned into the Royal Engineers, and opened a research establishment at Orford Ness where he and his team researched weapons, sights, and ammunition.  In 1915, Hopkinson discovered a similarity relation between the masses of explosive charges and their effects at a given distance. The same similarity relation was discovered independently in 1925 by Karl Julius Cranz in Germany. He learnt to fly and died on 26 August 1918 when his Bristol Fighter crashed en route from Martlesham Heath to London.

He is buried in the Parish of the Ascension Burial Ground in Cambridge, with his wife Mariana, née Siemens; they had seven daughters.

See also
Split-Hopkinson pressure bar

Notes

References 

Secondary sources

External links

 Biography at the University of Cambridge 
 Biography at King's College London

1874 births
1918 deaths
People from Birmingham, West Midlands
Alumni of Trinity College, Cambridge
Professors of engineering (Cambridge, 1875)
British automotive engineers
English engineers
English inventors
Fellows of the Royal Society
Royal Engineers officers
Companions of the Order of St Michael and St George
Aviators killed in aviation accidents or incidents in England
English aviators
Bertram
British Army personnel of World War I